RC Slavia Prague is a Czech rugby club based in Prague. They currently play in the KB Extraliga and are the oldest existing club in the Czech Republic. The club forms part of the Slavia Prague sports network.

History
The club was founded on 13 April 1927. On 7 May of that year, the first rugby match in Prague took place at Slavia, with Slavia Bratislava squaring off against Slavia Brno.

Slavia were the first winners of the Czechoslovak Championships, back in 1929. It turned out to be the start of a very successful period for them, winning five out of the first six championships.

The club has supplied a number of internationals over the years, among others Jan Macháček, one of arguably the two most well-known Czech rugby players (the other being Martin Jágr).

Historical names 
 1927 - SK Slavia Praha (Sportovní klub Slavia Praha)
 1951 – Dynamo Praha
 1964 – TJ Slavia Praha IPS (Tělovýchovná jednota Slavia Praha Inženýrské průmyslové stavby)
 1988 – SK Slavia Praha (Sportovní klub Slavia Praha)
 1993 – RC Slavia Praha (Rugby Club Slavia Praha)

Honours
 Czechoslovak Championships
 1929, 1930, 1932, 1933, 1934, 1956, 1957, 1958, 1961, 1964, 1969, 1971
 KB Extraliga
 2010

Notable players

  Zdenek Barchánek
  Jan Macháček

External links
 RC Slavia Prague
 80 years of Czcech Rugby

Czech rugby union teams
Sport in Prague
Rugby clubs established in 1927
1927 establishments in Czechoslovakia
Rugby